Francine Raymond (born 9 June 1956 in Montreal, Quebec) is a Francophone Canadian folk-style singer songwriter. In 1994, Raymond's music was distributed by Montreal-based Distribution Select.

In 2021, Raymond and her guitarist and songwriting partner Christian Péloquin were inducted into the Canadian Songwriters Hall of Fame.

Albums 

 Francine Raymond (1987)
 Souvenirs retrouvés (1989)
 Les années lumières (1993)
 Dualité (1996)
 Paradis perdu (2002)

References

1956 births
Living people
Canadian women singer-songwriters
Canadian singer-songwriters
Musicians from Montreal